The Department of Territories was an Australian government department that existed between December 1984 and July 1987. It was the second so-named Australian Government department.

History
The department was abolished as part of the massive restructuring of the Public Service announced by Prime Minister Bob Hawke in July 1987.

Scope
Information about the department's functions and/or government funding allocation could be found in the Administrative Arrangements Orders, the annual Portfolio Budget Statements and in the department's annual reports.

At its creation, the department dealt with:
Administration of the Australian Capital Territory, the Jervis Bay Territory, the Territory of Cocos (Keeling) Islands, the Territory of Christmas Island, the Coral Sea Islands Territory and the Territory of Ashmore and Cartier Islands and of Commonwealth responsibilities on Norfolk Island.
Constitutional development of the Northern Territory of Australia.

Structure
The department was a Commonwealth Public Service department, staffed by officials who were responsible to the Minister for Territories.

References

Ministries established in 1984
Territories